The Mattoon Jewish Community Center is a Jewish congregation in Mattoon, Illinois, United States of America. It was notable as North America's smallest Reform synagogue, when it had four households, but in 2022 has expanded to seven households. The congregation's services are held at Wesley United Methodist Church in Charleston.

History

The Mattoon Jewish Community Center (MJCC) is a Reform Jewish congregation in Mattoon, a city in Coles County, Illinois. The Jewish community has had a strong presence in Mattoon for more than 150 years. In 1948 - the same year as the founding of the State of Israel - the local Jewish community   incorporated and established the first organized synagogue in Mattoon. A residential house was purchased at 1607 Richmond Ave for this purpose and was named "The Mattoon Jewish Community Center."

The MJCC interior was remodeled having a central assembly and worship area that was 15 feet wide by 40 feet long. Located at the south end of the room was the Ark which contained two Torahs. Hanging from the ceiling, above the Ark, above was the Eternal Light (Ner Tamid) and to its left was the bronze, illuminated Memorial Board, which displayed the names of deceased members of the congregation. An electrical neon sign displaying a Magen David (Star of David) was in the window and was illuminated during Sabbath services. The north end of the building featured a professional-style kitchen with a commercial stove and large refrigerator. These facilities were used for the numerous community meals, and for the popular "Annual Community Corned Beef Supper" fundraiser which helped to fund the activities at the MJCC.

In the early 1960s, local businessman and scholar, Aaron Steinberg assumed the presidency. For the next 25 years, under his kind and knowledgeable leadership, the MJCC held a regular schedule of worship services and adult education classes. Student rabbis from the Hebrew Union College, in Cincinnati Ohio, served to lead the services and provide adult education. By the late 1980s the MJCC had a declining and aging congregation and no families with children. A Renaissance occurred in the early 1990s when the "baby boom" generation assumed leadership. For the next 20 years young families were enrolled, Saturday morning education for children was provided, and bar and bat mitzvahs were celebrated every year.

In the spring of 2000, the MJCC was targeted by a racist group. This group had printed "Wanted Posters" featuring the face of the current student Rabbi with accompanying anti-semitic text. They were found stapled on phone poles and distributed around the neighborhood.  Threatening messages were left in the mailbox and a swastika was spray-painted on the side of the building. In response, Mattoon police provided a visible presence during the Passover services that year. The MJCC met with local churches and interfaith organizations to organize a public "Not In Our Town" campaign. No further incidents were reported.

As the children grew up, relocated, and members died, attrition once again took its toll on the congregation. Down to five member families, and unable to afford the maintenance of a building, the decision was made to sell the building housing the MJCC and relocate.  Phone calls were made to all the churches in the Mattoon area, looking for a religious facility with space they would be willing to share, so Jewish services could be observed. The Trinity Episcopal Church most graciously became the host of this congregation. Jewish services are held at times separate from the Christian services at this location. Lay services are held throughout the year, presided by a congregant who received special training. Rabbinical services are also provided for high holy days and occasional Friday night services.

The congregation is able to use the facilities of the Trinity Episcopal Church at 2200 Western Avenue in Mattoon twice a month for Sabbath, as well as the High Holy Day services. The members forego meetings during the summer months and resume services during the High Holy Days in September. The Ark, containing two Torah scrolls, resides in the sanctuary next to the altar. For Yom Kippur in 2012, the congregation did not have a rabbi; however, their finances did permit a cantorial soloist from Indiana. The Reverend Ken Truelove, pastor of Trinity Episcopal Church, assisted with the preparation for Yom Kippur. The Trinity Episcopal Church is on the National Register of Historic Places.

With five households, the Mattoon Jewish Community Center is the smallest Reform synagogue in North America, as determined by the Union for Reform Judaism. The organization, which is the governing body of Reform Judaism, compiled the data for its almost 900 member Reform congregations in North America and, as is its custom, counted households, not individual members. The next smallest Reform congregation in North America is Temple Beth Tikvah in Regina, Saskatchewan, Canada, with five households.

References

External links 
 Photo of Mattoon Jewish Community Center at Trinity Episcopal Church, Yom Kippur, September 2012
 Video of Mattoon Jewish Community Center at Trinity Episcopal Church, Yom Kippur, September 2012

Reform synagogues in Illinois
Jewish organizations established in 1948
1948 establishments in Illinois